Daniel Heller-Roazen  is the Arthur W. Marks '19 Professor of Comparative Literature at Princeton University. He is one of the translators into English of work by Giorgio Agamben. He was elected as a member of the American Academy of Arts and Sciences in 2018. His father was the historian of psychoanalysis, Paul Roazen.

Books in English
 (ed. and tr.) Potentialities: Collected Essays in Philosophy by Giorgio Agamben, 1999.
 Fortune's Faces: The Roman de la Rose and the Poetics of Contingency, 2003. 
 Echolalias: On the Forgetting of Language, 2005. 
 The Inner Touch: Archaeology of a Sensation, 2007. Winner of the Modern Language Association's 2008 Aldo and Jeanne Scaglione Prize for Comparative Literary Studies. 
 The Enemy of All: Piracy and the Law of Nations, 2009.
 (ed.) The Arabian Nights, Norton Critical Edition, 2010.
 The Fifth Hammer: Pythagoras and the Disharmony of the World, 2011.
 Dark Tongues: The Art of Rogues and Riddlers, 2013.
 No One's Ways: An Essay on Infinite Naming, 2017.

References

1974 births
Living people
Comparative literature academics
Canadian academics
Princeton University faculty